Ravinder Kumar, publicly known as Ravi Dhiman, was born on October 1, 1961, in Jangal Kangra, Himachal Pradesh, India. He is an MLA from the Jaisinghpur constituency of Himachal Pradesh and a member of the Bharatiya Janata Party.

Personal life
Mr. Ravi Dhiman is the son of Late Smt. Soma Devi and Shri. Jagan Nath. He is married to Smt. Anisha Dhiman who works in the Education Department of Himachal Pradesh. They have a daughter and a son. He is a Graduate and CAIIB(I) from Indian Institute of Bankers.

Career

Then he joined Defense Formations and worked there for two years. In 1986 he joined the Punjab National Bank as a stenographer, and in 2012 he took voluntary retirement.

Politics
He ran as an independent candidate in 2012.

Joined BJP in February 2014; and Member, BJP State Executive Committee 2014 onwards.

In December 2017, he was elected to the State Legislative Assembly Jaisinghpur constituency and defeated Yadvendra Goma from votes margin of 10,710.

He was nominated as Member, Welfare and General Development Committees.

Current life
He lives in Alampur sub tehsil of Jaisinghpur tehsil of Kangra district, along with his wife.

He is also a chairperson for NGO Projects.

References

1961 births
Living people
Himachal Pradesh MLAs 2017–2022
People from Kangra, Himachal Pradesh
Bharatiya Janata Party politicians from Himachal Pradesh